The 1906–07 season was the 15th in the history of the Western Football League.

Division One was split into two sections of six clubs, with the winner of each section playing each other in a Championship decider. Fulham won Section A and West Ham United won Section B, with West Ham winning the decider 1–0. Fulham left the league at the end of the season as they were elected to the Football League for 1907–08. Chelsea, who made their first and only appearance in the league this season, were competing in the Football League at the same time. All the other member clubs of Division One also competed in the Southern League during this season. The Division Two champions for the first and only time were Staple Hill.

Division One
One new club joined Division One, which was increased from 11 to 12 clubs and split into two sections of six.
Chelsea

Section A

Section B

Championship decider 
At the end of the season, the winners of the two sections played a match to decide the overall champions.

Division Two
Three new clubs joined Division Two, which remained at 10 clubs after Salisbury City, Bristol East and Chippenham Town left the league.
121st R.F.A.
Newport
Treharris

References

1906-07
1906–07 in English association football leagues